Ross Daly (born 29 September 1952 in King's Lynn, Norfolk) is a world musician who specializes in music of the Cretan lyra.  Although of Irish descent, he has been living on the island of Crete for over 35 years.

Biography

Ross Daly has traveled the world, mainly in the Middle East, Central Asia and the Indian subcontinent, studying various forms of local music traditions. 

In 1982, he established an educational institution called Labyrinth Musical Workshop, in the village in Crete, twenty kilometers south of the capital city of Herakleion, more than 250 instruments that Daly collected during his travels are displayed.

Since 2002, seminars and "master-classes" are conducted every year with teachers of traditional music from around the world. Students from all over the world come to study with teachers of modal music each year. Labyrinth Musical Workshop was founded in order to initiate, mainly young people, in a creative approach to traditional musical idioms from various parts of the world.

The result was a lyra with three playing strings of 29 cm in length (the same as the standard Cretan lyra), and 18 sympathetic strings which resonate on Indian-styled jawari bridges (the number of sympathetic strings was later increased to 22).

Daly has released more than 35 albums of his own compositions and of his own arrangements of traditional melodies collected during his travels.

In Summer 2004, he was the artistic director of the cultural program of the Olympic Games for the Olympic city of Heraklion on the island of Crete, titled "Crete, Music Crossroads". He organized and artistically supervised 15 concerts with the participation of 300 musicians from all over the world, including: Jordi Savall, Eduardo Niebla, Huun Huur Tu, Habil Aliyev, Dhoad Gypsies of Rajasthan, Mohammad Rahim Khushnawaz, Chemirani Trio, Adel Selameh.

Ross Daly is the originator of the term Contemporary Modal Music, which refers to contemporary compositional works which draw their influences and inspiration from the broader world of Modal musical traditions which are found primarily (although not exclusively) in the vast geographical region between Western Africa and Western China. Composers of Contemporary Modal Music initially study intensively various of these traditions and subsequently compose new works in which they freely integrate influences and elements from these idioms into their work. The Musical Workshop Labyrinth, of which Ross Daly is the founder and artistic director, has been very active in promoting and supporting this type of composition as it crosses ethnic and other lines as well as stressing contemporary creative work in musical idioms which are usually considered to be “traditional” and therefore with their “creative center” in the past. Ross Daly himself disputes this notion, believing instead that the epithet “traditional” implies above all an element of timelessness in which the contributions of the past, present and future are equally important and relevant to the creative process. 
 
In the European Elections of 2009, he was candidate with the Ecologists Greens.

Discography

Oneirou Topi 1982
Lavyrinthos 1984
Ross Daly 1986
Anadysi 1987
Elefthero Simio 1989
7 songs and 1 Semai (with Spyridoula Toutoudaki) 1989
Kriti 1 (with Manolis Manassakis) 1989
Pnoe (with Vassilis Soukas)1990
Hori 1990
the Circle at the Crossroads 1990
Kriti 2 (with Babis Chairetis aka “Vourgias”)
Selected Works 1991
An Ki (with Djamchid Chemirani) 1991
Mıtos (1992)
Cross Current (with Djamchid Chemirani & Irshad Khan) 1994
Naghma (with Paul Grant, Bijan Chemirani & Nayan Ghosh) 1998
At The Cafe Aman 1998
Synavgia 1998
Beyond The Horizon 2001
Gulistan (with Bijan Chemirani) 2001
Kin Kin 2002
Music Of Crete 2002
Iris 2003
Mıcrokosmos 2003
Echo Of Time 2004
Spyrıdoula Toutoudaki - Ross Daly / Me Ti Fevga Tou Kerou 2004
Live At Theatre De La Vılle / Avec Le Trio Chemıranı 2005
White Dragon 2008
The Other Side 2014
Tin Anixi Perimenes (with Vassilis Stavrakakis, Giorgos Manolakis)2015
Osi Hara’Houn ta Poulia (with Evgenia Damavoliti-Toli) 2016
Lunar (with Kelly Thoma) 2017

Concerts at festivals
Daly has performed in many venues and festivals: 
Musicaves, Givry (71), France (2013)
Kala Kathoumena, Nicosia (Old City), Cyprus (2012)
Bourges, France (2008)
Al Dhafra Concert Hall, Abu Dhabi (2008)
Rainforest World Music Festival, Sarawak, Malaysia (2008)
Théâtre de la Ville, Paris, France (1992–93, 2002,2003,2005, 2008)
Nikos Kazantzakis Theater, Herakleion, Crete (1996, 1999, 2001, 2008)
Jerusalem Oud Festival (2008)
San Sebastien Festival, Spain (2008)
Purcell Room, London (2007), Clarinet Festival, Bretagne (2008)
Pieśń naszych korzeni, Song of our Roots, Jarosław, Poland (2008)
Emirates Palace Theater (2006, 2007)
Nuremberg, Germany (1992, 2006)
Migration Festival, Taipei, Taiwan (2006)
International Lute Festival, Tetouan, Morocco (2006)
Madrid Summer Festival, Sabatini Gardens, Spain (2006)
International Festival, Warsaw, Poland (2006)
Manresa Festival, Barcelona, Spain (2006)
Municipal concert hall, Kayseri, Turkey (2006)
Athens Concert Hall, (1993, 2006)
Cairo Opera House (2006)
Cemal Reşit Rey Concert Hall, Istanbul, Τurkey (1997, 2005, 2006)
National Concert Hall, Dublin, Ireland(2005)
Konzerthaus Mozart Saal, Vienna, Austria (2005)
San Francisco World Music Festival, U.S.A (2005)
State Theatre Company, Adelaide, Australia (2005)
Skala Aglantza Nicosia, Cyprus (2005)
Oslo Cathedral (2004)
Södra Teatern, Stockholm, Sweden (2004)
World Music Festival, Skopje, Macedonia (1999, 2003)
Urkult Festival, Nämforsen, Sweden (2003)
Festival de Saint Chartier, France (2003)
Copanhagen, Denmark (1995–97, 2003)
Thessaloniki Concert Hall (2002)
Rudolstadt Festival, Germany (2002)
Queen Elizabeth Hall, London, U.K (1998, 2000, 2002)
Protestant Church, Brussels, Belgium (2001)
Isle of Wight Festival (2000)
Archaeological Museum, Madrid, Spain (1998–99, 2001)
Festival of Murcia, Spain (1999)
WDR, Munich, Germany (1999)
Lycabbetus theatre, Athens (1987,91,93,98)
Odeon of Herodes Atticus, Greece (1992, 1998, 2022)
Aarhus, Denmark (1997)
Huset theatre, Ahlborg, Denmark (1995–97)
Passionskirche, Berlin (1994,95,96)
Les Nuits Atypiques Festival, Langon, France (1995)
Luxemburg Concert Hall (1992, 1994)
WDR Wuppertal, Germany (1992)
Frankfurt, Germany (1992)
Epidaurus Theatre, Greece

References

Irish folk musicians
Cretan musicians
Greek musicians
Living people
1952 births
People from King's Lynn
English people of Irish descent
British expatriates in Greece